Chełm is a village in the administrative district of Gmina Wolbrom, within Olkusz County, Lesser Poland Voivodeship, in southern Poland.

The village has a population of 892.

References

Villages in Olkusz County